Haldor Halderson (Halldór Halldórsson; January 6, 1899 – August 1, 1965) was an Icelandic-Canadian ice hockey player who competed in the 1920 Summer Olympics.

Halderson was the right wing for the Winnipeg Falcons, the Canadian team which won the Olympic gold medal in 1920. Slim then joined the Victoria Aristocrats/Victoria Cougars and helped them win the Stanley Cup in 1925. On both occasions he was a teammate of fellow Icelandic-Canadian ice hockey star Frank Fredrickson, making them the first players to win an Olympic gold medal and a Stanley Cup.

Playing career
Halderson was born as Halldór Halldórsson in Winnipeg, Manitoba, to Icelandic immigrants Halldór Kristinn Halldórsson and Jórunn Kristolína Jónsdóttir.

Halderson never played organized junior or intermediate ice hockey in his hometown of Winnipeg, but sprang into fame overnight when he joined the senior ranks of the Winnipeg Ypres team of the Manitoba Hockey Association's military league in 1917–18. Halderson was nicknamed "Slim" due to his lanky frame during his first years in senior amateur and professional hockey. At the start of the 1921–22 season, Halderson's first in the PCHA with the Victoria Aristocrats, he weighed in at only 166 pounds on a 6 feet 2 inches frame. As his playing career went along he put on more weight.

During the 1920–21 season, Canadian Amateur Hockey Association president H. J. Sterling hired a detective who discovered that Halderson and teammate Robert Benson received C$6,500 to play amateur hockey. The Amateur Athletic Union of Canada voided Halderson's registration card and he was suspended from the 1921 Allan Cup playoffs, although the Saskatchewan Amateur Hockey Association allowed him and his Saskatoon team to continue in the league playoffs.

Statistics

Regular season and playoffs

International

Awards and achievements
Allan Cup Championship – 1920
Olympic Gold Metalist – 1920
PCHA First All-Star Team – 1923
PCHA Second All-Star Team – 1922
Stanley Cup Championship – 1925
AHA First All-Star Team – 1930, 1936, and 1937
Member of the Manitoba Hockey Hall of Fame

References

External links

Falcons

1899 births
1965 deaths
Burials at Brookside Cemetery (Winnipeg)
Canadian ice hockey defencemen
Canadian people of Icelandic descent
Detroit Cougars players
Duluth Hornets players
Ice hockey players at the 1920 Summer Olympics
Kansas City Pla-Mors players
Medalists at the 1920 Summer Olympics
Newark Bulldogs players
Olympic gold medalists for Canada
Olympic ice hockey players of Canada
Olympic medalists in ice hockey
Quebec Castors players
Ice hockey people from Winnipeg
Stanley Cup champions
Toronto Maple Leafs players
Tulsa Oilers (AHA) players
Victoria Aristocrats players
Victoria Cougars (1911–1926) players
Wichita Skyhawks players
Winnipeg Falcons players
Winnipeg Monarchs players